Kays Al Zbaide (Arabic:قيس الزبيدي) is an Iraqi-born director, writer and researcher in film theory and montage. He studied both montage (1964) and photography (1969) at the Higher Institute of Cinema in Germany. The he proceeded to work as a director, cameraman, and scenario writer. He directed a number of documentary and narrative films about Palestine, some of which won Arab and international awards. He is best known for his films Al-yazerli (1974), The Adventure (1974) and Al-lail (1992).

Life and career 
Kays Al Zbaide graduated from the Higher Institute of Cinema in Germany with a diploma in Montage (1964) and in Photography (1969). Then he proceeded to work at the DIVA Studio for Documentary Films and at the Higher Institute of Cinema in Germany in montage, photography and directing.

Al Zbaide has organized several cinematic courses in scenario, directing, and editing in Tunis and at the Radio and TV Training Center, Union of Arab Broadcasters in Damascus, Al-Manar TV Training Center in Beirut, Goethe Institute in Damascus, and The Royal Jordanian Commission in Amman. He also founded the "Palestinian National Film Archive" in cooperation with the Federal Archives in Berlin, Germany.

Al Zbaide directed a set of documentaries at the General Cinema Foundation in Damascus and in the Department of Culture and Information in Lebanon and in Germany. Some of his films have actually won Arab and international awards. He also directed some experimental films, including "The Visit" in 1970 and "Al-Yazerli" in 1974, which suffered censorship wherever it was screened. In 1995, critic Mohsen Wafi published a book titled "A Lover from Palestine" about Al Zbaide and his films. And in 2019, Syrian director Muhammad Malas published a biography titled "Qais Al-Zubaidi Life as Scraps on the Wall".

Works

Films 

 Far from the Homeland, 1969.
 Men Under the Sun, 1970.
 The Visit, 1970.
 The Knife, 1972.
 The Mexican Hoax, 1972.
 Testimonies of Palestinian Children in Wartime, 1972.
 Love's Other Face, 1973.
 The Adventure, 1974.
 Al Yazerli, 1974.
 Al-lail, 1992.

Books 

 The Structure of a TV Drama Series: Towards a New Dramatic, Qudamus Publishing House, 2001.
 The Dramatic of Change: Bertolt Brecht, Canaan House, 2004.
 The Visual and Audible in Cinema, Damascus: The General Film Organization, 2006.
 Palestine in Cinema, Institute for Palestine Studies, 2006.
 The Literary Medium in Cinema, Abu Dhabi: Festival: Films from the Emirates, 2007.
 Monographs in Film’s Image, Theory, and History, Damascus: The General Film Organization, 2010.
 In Film Culture – Monographies, Cairo: The General Authority for Cultural Palaces, 2013.
 Documentary Film: Reality Without Banks, Palestinian Ministry of Culture, 2017.
 Studies in the Structure of the Film Medium, Sharjah: Department of Culture, 2018.

References

See also 

 Abbas Khadir
 Kasim Abid

Iraqi documentary filmmakers
Iraqi documentary film directors
Iraqi film directors
Iraqi screenwriters
Living people
Iraqi writers
Iraqi male writers
Year of birth missing (living people)